The 1984–85 Alabama Crimson Tide men's basketball team represented the University of Alabama in the 1984-85 NCAA Division I men's basketball season. The team's head coach was Wimp Sanderson, who was in his fifth season at Alabama. The team played their home games at Coleman Coliseum in Tuscaloosa, Alabama. They finished the season 23–10, 11–7 in SEC play, finishing in a tie for third place.

Key additions were freshman forward Derrick McKey, the Tide's lone signee from Meridian High School in Mississippi, and guard Mark Gottfried, a transfer from Oral Roberts University.

The Tide made it to the 1985 SEC men's basketball tournament final, but lost to Auburn. They received an at-large bid to the 1985 NCAA Division I men's basketball tournament, where they defeated Arizona and VCU before losing to North Carolina State in the Sweet Sixteen.

Roster

References 

Alabama Crimson Tide men's basketball seasons
Alabama
Alabama
1984 in sports in Alabama
1985 in sports in Alabama